Incheol Shin is a South Korean cancer researcher and, since 2005, a faculty member at the Department of Life Science, College of Natural Science, Hanyang University, Seoul, Republic of Korea. He was formerly a post-doc and then research faculty at Vanderbilt Ingram Cancer Center in Nashville, Tennessee, U.S.A.

Publications

References

Living people
South Korean biologists
Cancer researchers
Academic staff of Hanyang University
Year of birth missing (living people)
Fred Hutchinson Cancer Research Center people